Whites Creek is a stream in eastern Crawford County in the U.S. state of Missouri. It is a tributary of Brazil Creek.

Anthonies Mill on Brazil Creek is one mile east of the confluence in Washington County. The community of Vilander was about 1.5 miles to the west of the confluence. Bourbon lies about nine miles to the northwest on Route N.

Whites Creek most likely has the name of a local family.

See also
List of rivers of Missouri

References

Rivers of Crawford County, Missouri
Rivers of Missouri